Tymur Taymazov (Russian/,, born 8 September 1970) is a former Ossetian-Ukrainian weightlifter, Olympic champion and two time World Champion.

He was born in Nogir, North Ossetia. Taymazov has a younger brother, Artur, who was also 2004 Olympic Champion in freestyle wrestling 120 kg weight category, but had gold medals for 2008 and 2012 withdrawn for doping offences. Timur is a member of the Central Sports Club of the Armed Forces of Ukraine.

Career

Olympics
He received a silver medal at the 1992 Summer Olympics in Barcelona.

He participated in the 1996 Summer Olympics after taking a break year long break in 1995. After the snatch portion of the competition, he was in third place behind Nicu Vlad (by 2.5 kg) and Sergey Srystov (by bodyweight). In the clean & jerk portion of the competition Taymasov was the last lifter to attempt a lift, with his first lift of 227.5 kg being successful he moved into the lead. Srystov and Vlad were unable to make their next lifts and Taymasov had won. After clinching the gold medal, he attempted and successfully made a new Olympic Record clean & jerk of 235.0 kg, bringing his total to 430.0 kg.

Major results

References

External links

1970 births
Living people
People from Prigorodny District, North Ossetia–Alania
Russian emigrants to Ukraine
Ukrainian people of Ossetian descent
Armed Forces sports society (Ukraine) athletes
Soviet male weightlifters
Ukrainian male weightlifters
Olympic weightlifters of the Unified Team
Olympic weightlifters of Ukraine
Weightlifters at the 1992 Summer Olympics
Weightlifters at the 1996 Summer Olympics
Olympic gold medalists for Ukraine
Olympic silver medalists for the Unified Team
Olympic medalists in weightlifting
Ossetian people
Medalists at the 1996 Summer Olympics
Medalists at the 1992 Summer Olympics
Naturalised citizens of Russia
Sportspeople from North Ossetia–Alania
European Weightlifting Championships medalists
World Weightlifting Championships medalists